The Gottfried Krueger Brewing Company was a brewery in Newark, New Jersey founded by Gottfried Krueger and John Laible (Gottfried's Uncle) in 1858. The company produced Krueger's Special Beer, the first beer to be sold in cans, in November, 1933.

History 
Krueger's was founded 1858; however, its roots go further back. In 1851 Louis Adam and J. Braun met to form a new brewery, but Braun died, so Adam partnered with John Liable to form Liable & Adam. In 1851, Liable invited his nephew from Germany, Gottfried Krueger, then 16, to assist in the brewery. In 1858, Adam took over the brewery and Liable invested in Krueger, until 1865, when Krueger partnered with Gottlieb Hill to purchase Louis Adam's brewery under the Hill & Krueger banner. The brewery went from 4,000 to 25,000 within 10 years. When Hill passed in 1875 Kruger became sole owner and changed the brand to G. Kruger Brewing Company.

1882 began a period of success for Krueger. He joined a syndicate with Peter Hauck and Anton Hupfel to become the United States Brewing Company. Kruger then purchased a large stake in Lyons & Sons Brewery, The Home Brewing Co., Eagle Brewery, and Union Brewery. In 1908 United States Brewing bought Trefz Brewery (most known for the "River of Beer" incident in 1889) and Albany Brewery and produced more than 500,000 barrels a year. In 1914 Gottfried was visiting Germany when World War I broke out and was forced to stay until the war ended. Prohibition forced the closure of the brewery and Gottfried died in 1926.

Post Prohibition
During Prohibition, Krueger Brewing sold near beer (0.5% alcohol by weight) and soda. This gave them a distinct advantage when the Prohibition alcohol limit was increased to 3.2%, so the brewery was able to produce beer at 3.2% alcohol by weight the morning of April 7, 1934 – right into cups. According to one source, it took two days for the line in the front of the brewery to return to order. 

In 1933, Krueger was the first company to produce beer in cans, thanks to a partnership with American Can Company. This was a big risk, so American Can offered to install the equipment for free and Krueger would only pay for it if the plan was successful. A initial test run of 2,000 cans filled with the 3.2% product were labeled "Krueger's Special Beer" and provided to brewery employees and friends of the brewery for evaluation.  The enthusiastic reception encouraged them to release canned versions of their full strength Krueger's Cream Ale and Krueger's Finest Beer brands to the public on January 24, 1935.  These cans were initially shipped to Richmond, Virginia, the farthest point of Kreuger's distribution area, in case the experiment failed.  Other canned products soon followed, including Krueger's Bock and Kent India Pale Ale.      

By 1952, the Newark plant was producing one million barrels a year. Unfortunately, the 1950s saw consolidation in the brewing industry, and breweries like Anheuser-Busch and Miller squeezed out market share. In 1961, Krueger was licensed to Narragansett Brewing until production ceased.

See also
 List of defunct breweries in the United States

References

External links
 "Gottfried Krueger Brewing Company", gottfriedkruegerbrewingcompany.com.
 "Gottfried Krueger Brewing Company", VirtualNewarkNJ.com.

Defunct brewery companies of the United States
Falstaff Brewing Corporation
History of Newark, New Jersey
Manufacturing companies based in Newark, New Jersey
Beer brewing companies based in New Jersey